An administrative law judge (ALJ) in the United States is a judge and trier of fact who both presides over trials and adjudicates claims or disputes involving administrative law. ALJs can administer oaths, take testimony, rule on questions of evidence, and make factual and legal determinations. 

In the United States, the United States Supreme Court has recognized that the role of a federal administrative law judge is "functionally comparable" to that of an Article III judge. An ALJ's powers are often, if not generally, comparable to those of a trial judge, as ALJs may issue subpoenas, rule on proffers of evidence, regulate the course of the hearing, and make or recommend decisions.

Depending upon the agency's jurisdiction, proceedings may have complex multi-party adjudication, as is the case with the  Federal Energy Regulatory Commission, or simplified and less formal procedures, as is the case with the Social Security Administration.

Federal appointment and tenure 
The Administrative Procedure Act of 1946 (APA) requires that federal ALJs be appointed based on scores achieved in a comprehensive testing procedure, including a four-hour written examination and an oral examination before a panel that includes an Office of Personnel Management representative, an American Bar Association representative, and a sitting federal ALJ. Federal ALJs are the only merit-based judicial corps in the United States.

In American administrative law, ALJs are Article I judges under the U.S. Constitution. As such, they do not exercise full judicial power, essentially, the power over life, liberty, and property. Article I (legislative) judges and courts are not constrained to rendering opinions for only a "case or controversy" before them and may render advisory opinions on a purely prospective basis, such as, e.g., Congressional reference cases assigned to the Court of Federal Claims. Agency ALJs do not have the power to offer such advisory opinions, as it would be in violation of the power afforded them under the Administrative Procedures Act, 5 U.S.C. §557. Unlike the agency, ALJs are not policy or rule makers.

ALJs are generally considered to be part of the executive branch, not the judicial branch, but the APA is designed to guarantee the decisional independence of ALJs. They have absolute immunity from liability for their judicial acts and are triers of fact "insulated from political influence". Federal administrative law judges are not responsible to, or subject to, the supervision or direction of employees or agents of the federal agency engaged in the performance of investigative or prosecution functions for the agency. Ex parte communications are prohibited. ALJs are exempt from performance ratings, evaluation, and bonuses. 5 CFR 930.206. Agency officials may not interfere with their decision-making, and administrative law judges may be discharged only for good cause based upon a complaint filed by the agency with the Merit Systems Protection Board (MSPB) established and determined after an APA hearing on the record before an MSPB ALJ. Only ALJs receive these statutory protections; "hearing officers" or "trial examiners", with delegated hearing functions, are not similarly protected by the APA.

In Lucia v. SEC, decided in June 2018, the Supreme Court held that ALJs are Inferior Officers within the meaning of the Appointments Clause of the United States Constitution. This means that they must be appointed by the president (alone), by courts of law, or by head of department (their appointment is not subject to the Senate's advice and consent), but in practice, because Supreme Court of the United States in Franklin v. Mass., 505 U.S. 788 (1992), held that the U.S. President is not an agency under the Administrative Procedure Act, all ALJs must be appointed by heads of the agencies.

Attorney Advisors 
ALJs usually hire Attorney Advisors, who serve a role similar to judicial law clerks of Article III judges. For example, Attorney Advisors assist the ALJs with research, writing, drafting of opinions and orders, and assisting with the administration of hearings and other trial-like adjudications. Furthermore, Attorney Advisors usually have practiced as lawyers in the particular field which the ALJ possesses expertise in.

Authority and review of federal ALJs 
The United States Supreme Court has recognized that the role of a federal administrative law judge is "functionally comparable" to that of an Article III judge. An ALJ's powers are often, if not generally, comparable to those of a trial judge: an ALJ may issue subpoenas, rule on proffers of evidence, regulate the course of the hearing, and make or recommend decisions. ALJs are limited as they have no power to sanction unless a statute provides such a power. Instead, the ALJ may refer a matter to an Article III Court to seek enforcement or sanctions. The process of agency adjudication is currently structured so as to assure that ALJs exercise independent judgment on the evidence before them, free from pressures by the parties or other officials within the agency.

The procedure for reviewing an ALJ's decision varies depending upon the agency. Agencies generally have an internal appellate body, with some agencies having a Cabinet secretary decide the final internal appeals. Moreover, after the internal agency appeals have been exhausted, a party may have the right to file an appeal in the state or federal courts. Relevant statutes usually require a party to exhaust all administrative appeals before they are allowed to sue an agency in court.

Central panels 
Administrative law judges may be employed by a "central panel" organization, which provides the judges with independence from agencies. The California Administrative Procedure Act created an early central panel in 1945, and it served as a model for other states. By 2015, over half of states had created such panels.

State ALJs 
Most U.S. states have a statute modeled after the APA. In some states, such as New Jersey, the state law is also known as the Administrative Procedure Act.

Unlike federal ALJs, whose powers are guaranteed by federal statute, state ALJs have widely varying power and prestige. In some state law contexts, ALJs have almost no power; their decisions are accorded practically no deference and become, in effect, recommendations. In some cities, ALJs are at-will employees of the agency, making their decisional independence potentially questionable. In some agencies, ALJs dress like lawyers in business suits, share offices, and hold hearings in ordinary conference rooms. In other agencies (especially certain offices of the Division of Workers' Compensation of the California Department of Industrial Relations), ALJs wear robes like Article III judges, are referred to as "Honorable" and "Your Honor", work in private chambers, hold hearings in special "hearing rooms" that look like small courtrooms, and have court clerks who swear in witnesses. State ALJs can be generalists or specialize in specific fields of law, such as tax law.

Professional organizations 
Professional organizations that represent federal ALJs include the Federal Administrative Law Judges Conference, the Association of Administrative Law Judges, which represents only Social Security ALJs, and the Forum of United States Administrative Law judges. Professional organizations that include both state and federal ALJs include the National Association of Administrative Law Judiciary, the ABA National Conference of Administrative Law Judiciary, and the National Association of Hearing Officials.

International comparisons 
Unlike the United States, in the United Kingdom the Tribunals, Courts and Enforcement Act 2007 recognises legally qualified members of the national system of administrative law tribunals as members of the judiciary of the United Kingdom who are guaranteed judicial independence.

ALJs cannot be recognized as members of the judicial branch of government (without first completely ejecting them from their home agencies in the executive branch), because to do so would violate the bedrock principle of separation of powers as embodied in the U.S. Constitution.  In a 2013 majority opinion signed by Associate Justice Antonin Scalia, the U.S. Supreme Court explained:

List of U.S. federal agencies with ALJs 
Most of the agencies below have only a few dozen ALJs. In 2013, the Social Security Administration (SSA) had by far the largest number of ALJs at over 1,400, who adjudicate over 700,000 cases each year. The average SSA hearing process occurs over a period of 373 days.

 Commodity Futures Trading Commission
 Department of Agriculture
 Department of Health and Human Services/Department Appeals Board
 Department of Health and Human Services/Office of Medicare Hearings and Appeals
 Department of Housing and Urban Development
 Department of the Interior
 Department of Justice/Executive Office for Immigration Review
 Department of Labor
 Department of Transportation
 Department of Veterans Affairs
 Drug Enforcement Administration
 Environmental Protection Agency
 Federal Aviation Administration
 Federal Communications Commission
 Federal Energy Regulatory Commission
 Federal Labor Relations Authority
 Federal Maritime Commission
 Federal Mine Safety and Health Review Commission
 Federal Reserve Board of Governors
 Federal Trade Commission
 Food and Drug Administration
 General Services Administration
 International Trade Commission
 Merit Systems Protection Board
 National Labor Relations Board
 National Transportation Safety Board
 Nuclear Regulatory Commission
 Occupational Safety and Health Review Commission
 Office of Financial Institution Adjudication
 Patent and Trademark Office
 United States Coast Guard
 United States Postal Service
 Securities and Exchange Commission
 Small Business Administration
 Social Security Administration

Other federal agencies may request the U.S. Office of Personnel Management to lend them Administrative Law Judges from other federal agencies for a period of up to six months.

List of state departments and agencies with ALJs 
Some states, such as California, follow the federal model of having a separate corps of ALJs attached to each agency that uses them.  Others, such as New Jersey, have consolidated all ALJs together into a single agency that holds hearings on behalf of all other state agencies. This type of state adjudicatory agency is called a "central panel agency".  Many states have a central panel agency, but the agency does not handle all the hearings for every state agency.

Alabama Department of Revenue
California Department of Consumer Affairs
California Department of Health Services
California Department of Industrial Relations
California Department of Social Services
California Employment Development Department
California Department of Developmental Services
 Office of Administrative Hearings web page
 Fair Hearings Complaint process web page
California Office of Tax Appeals
California Public Utilities Commission
California State Personnel Board
Colorado Office of Administrative Courts
Colorado Public Utilities Commission
Florida Division of Administrative Hearings
Georgia Office of State Administrative Hearings
Illinois Human Rights Commission
Indiana Department of Workforce Development
Industrial Commission of Arizona
Iowa Department of Corrections
Iowa Department of Inspections and Appeals-Division of Administrative Hearings (does hearings for some but not all state agencies)
Iowa Workforce Development Department
Louisiana Division of Administrative Law
Maryland Office of Administrative Hearings
Maryland Public Service Commission (hearings for public utility cases)
Massachusetts Executive Office of Transportation
Massachusetts Department of Environmental Protection
Michigan State Office of Administrative Hearings and Rules
Minnesota Office of Administrative Hearings (does hearings for some but not all state agencies)
Mississippi Department of Employment Security, Office of the Governor
New Jersey Office of Administrative Law (does hearings for all state agencies)
New York City Office of Administrative Trials and Hearings (does hearings for some but not all city agencies)
New York City Department of Finance (hearings for parking violations)
New York State Department of Environmental Conservation
New York State Department of Labor
New York State Department of Motor Vehicles Traffic Violations Bureau
New York State Department of State
New York State Office of Temporary and Disability Assistance 
Oklahoma Workers' Compensation Court Commission 
Pennsylvania Department of Insurance
Pennsylvania Department of Labor and Industry, Bureau of Workers' Compensation
Pennsylvania Liquor Control Board
Pennsylvania Public Utility Commission
South Carolina Administrative Law Court (does hearings for all state agencies)
Texas Department of Banking
Texas Finance Commission
Texas Health and Human Services Commission
Railroad Commission of Texas
Texas State Office of Administrative Hearings (does hearings for only some state agencies)
Washington Office of Administrative Hearings (does hearings for all state agencies plus some local ones)
West Virginia Public Employees Grievance Board
West Virginia Public Service Commission
West Virginia Insurance Commission (Workers Compensation)

See also
Federal tribunals in the United States
Federal judiciary of the United States
Administrative court

References

External links
The Forum of United States Administrative Law Judges (FORUM)
National Association of Administrative Law Judiciary
Federal Administrative Law Judges Conference

Judges
United States administrative law